Escuminac may refer to:

Places in New Brunswick, Canada 
 Escuminac, New Brunswick, a rural community
 Escuminac disaster (1959)
 Point Escuminac, a cape at the mouth of St. Lawrence River, in the Northumberland Strait

Places in Quebec, Canada 
 Escuminac, Quebec, a municipality
 Escuminac River, Quebec
 Escuminac Formation, a geologic formation